Jason Landry is a photographer, writer about music and photography, and owner–operator of the Panopticon art gallery in Boston.

Personal life
Jason Landry is a 1991 graduate of Portsmouth High School in Portsmouth, New Hampshire, where he took his first photography class in 1990.  He dropped out of the Art Institute of Boston after one year of study.  He later received a Bachelor of Fine Arts from the Massachusetts College of Art and Design, and a Master of Fine Arts (MFA) from Lesley University.

By January 2014, Landry lived in Back Bay, Boston.  By that June, he was married.

Career
Landry worked for New England Telephone for ten years.

While a graduate student, Landry worked for Boston University's Photographic Resource Center: on its board of directors, as the education manager, and finally the programs and operations manager.  There, Landry learned about the business side of art, and bought the Panopticon art gallery in Boston after receiving his graduate degree.

Landry published a non-fiction book, Instant Connections: Essays and Interviews on Photography.  Fifty percent of all sales were earmarked for donation to the New Hampshire Art Association.  The book includes interviews with Harold Feinstein, Vik Muniz, Leonard Nimoy, and William Wegman.  Instant Connections was the first book by publishing house Doolittle Press.  Landry has also written about music, for The Huffington Post.

In 2013, Landry told an interviewer that he had been hired as the MFA director at the New Hampshire Institute of Art.

References

Further reading

External links
 
 

American art curators
Boston University staff
Living people
Lesley University alumni
Massachusetts College of Art and Design alumni
People from Back Bay, Boston
Year of birth missing (living people)